Cittarium maestratii is an extinct species of a sea snail, a marine gastropod mollusk in the family Tegulidae.

It is known from Chattian, that is stage of a Late Oligocene.

Distribution 
St-Paul-Les-Dax, Aquitaine, France.

References

External links
 photo

maestratii